Grace Carter (born 10 August 1989) is a British volleyball player. She competed for Great Britain at the 2012 Summer Olympics.

Domestic career
She played for them from 2010 to 2012, when she left the club and joined , another top division team whom she played for and captained until 2016. She then joined , whom she played and captained for until their relegation in 2019.

International career
Carter played volleyball for Great Britain, debuting in 2007 when the team was formed, and also appeared at the 2012 Summer Olympics.

References

External links
 Grace Carter Photos at Zimbio.com

British women's volleyball players
Volleyball players at the 2012 Summer Olympics
Olympic volleyball players of Great Britain
1989 births
Living people
Sportspeople from Nottingham
Middle blockers